Small nuclear ribonucleoprotein Sm D3 is a protein that in humans is encoded by the SNRPD3 gene.

Function 

The protein encoded by this gene belongs to the small nuclear ribonucleoprotein core protein family. It is required for pre-mRNA splicing and small nuclear ribonucleoprotein biogenesis.

Interactions 

SNRPD3 has been shown to interact with:
 CDC5L, 
 CLNS1A, 
 DDX20,  and
 Protein arginine methyltransferase 5.

References

Further reading